Psalm 25 is the 25th psalm of the Book of Psalms, beginning in English in the King James Version: "Unto thee, O LORD, do I lift up my soul.". The Book of Psalms is part of the third section of the Hebrew Bible, and a book of the Christian Old Testament. In the slightly different numbering system used in the Greek Septuagint and Latin Vulgate translations of the Bible, this psalm is Psalm 24. In Latin, it is known as "Ad te Domine levavi animam meam". The psalm, attributed to David, has the form of an acrostic Hebrew poem.

The psalm forms a regular part of Jewish, Catholic, Lutheran, Anglican and Nonconformist Protestant liturgies. Metrical hymns in English and German were derived from the psalm, such as "Zu dir, o Gott, erheben wir". The psalm has often been set to music. Orlando Gibbons composed an anthem in English, O Lord, I lift my heart to thee. Heinrich Schütz composed a setting in German "Nach dir verlangt mich", as part of the Becker Psalter.  Johann Sebastian Bach used verses from the psalm in his early cantata, .

Text

Hebrew Bible version 
Following is the Hebrew text of Psalm 25:

This psalm has a strong formal relationship with Psalm 34. Both are alphabetic acrostics, with missing each time the verse Waw, which was added a verse to Pe a prayer of deliverance of Israel. As an acrostic, the verses in the psalm are arranged according to the Hebrew alphabet, with the exception of the letters Bet, Waw and Qoph which together, according to Jewish interpreters, made reference to the word gehinom (hell).

King James Version 
 Unto thee, O LORD, do I lift up my soul.
 O my God, I trust in thee: let me not be ashamed, let not mine enemies triumph over me.
 Yea, let none that wait on thee be ashamed: let them be ashamed which transgress without cause.
 Shew me thy ways, O LORD; teach me thy paths.
 Lead me in thy truth, and teach me: for thou art the God of my salvation; on thee do I wait all the day.
 Remember, O LORD, thy tender mercies and thy lovingkindnesses; for they have been ever of old.
 Remember not the sins of my youth, nor my transgressions: according to thy mercy remember thou me for thy goodness' sake, O LORD.
 Good and upright is the LORD: therefore will he teach sinners in the way.
 The meek will he guide in judgment: and the meek will he teach his way.
 All the paths of the LORD are mercy and truth unto such as keep his covenant and his testimonies.
 For thy name's sake, O LORD, pardon mine iniquity; for it is great.
 What man is he that feareth the LORD? him shall he teach in the way that he shall choose.
 His soul shall dwell at ease; and his seed shall inherit the earth.
 The secret of the LORD is with them that fear him; and he will shew them his covenant.
 Mine eyes are ever toward the LORD; for he shall pluck my feet out of the net.
 Turn thee unto me, and have mercy upon me; for I am desolate and afflicted.
 The troubles of my heart are enlarged: O bring thou me out of my distresses.
 Look upon mine affliction and my pain; and forgive all my sins.
 Consider mine enemies; for they are many; and they hate me with cruel hatred.
 O keep my soul, and deliver me: let me not be ashamed; for I put my trust in thee.
 Let integrity and uprightness preserve me; for I wait on thee.
 Redeem Israel, O God, out of all his troubles.

Structure
The psalm is into three parts.

In the first portion of the psalm, David:
 professes his desire towards God: 
 professes his dependence upon God 
 begs direction from God 
 professes God's infinite mercy.

In the middle portion, he addresses his own iniquities;

In the concluding portion, he pleads:
 God's mercy: 
 his own misery, distress, affliction and pain. 
 the iniquity of his enemies, and deliverance from them.  
 He pleads his own integrity.

Dating
In the International Critical Commentary, Charles and Emilie Briggs date this psalm to "the Persian period prior to Nehemiah", that is, between about 539 and 445 BCE.

The 19th-century Baptist preacher Charles Spurgeon claims "it is evidently a composition of David's later days, for he mentions the sins of his youth, and from its painful references to the craft and cruelty of his many foes, it will not be too speculative a theory to refer it to the period when Absalom was heading the great rebellion against him."

Uses

Judaism
 The psalm is recited as part of tachanun in the Sephardic rite.
 Verse 4 is recited responsively during the repetition of the Amidah on Rosh Hashanah.
 Verse 6 is the third verse of V'hu Rachum in Pesukei Dezimra part of the opening paragraph of the long Tachanun recited on Mondays and Thursdays, and part of the final paragraph of the regular Tachanun.

Catholic Church
This psalm is characterized by confidence of David the penitent king. That is why, from the sixth century, the Church begins the first Sunday of Advent with the first verses sung of it, namely the Introit in Old Roman and Gregorian, pending the Nativity.

Book of Common Prayer
In the Church of England's Book of Common Prayer, this psalm is appointed to be read on the morning of the fifth day of the month.

Protestant Christianity
A survey of organists in the Dutch Reformed denomination (from May 2000 to May 2001) revealed that Psalm 25 is the third most sung Psalm in Reformed worship services. Only Psalm 119 and Psalm 89 are sung more frequently.

Musical settings
Hymns derived from Psalm 25 include Heinrich Bone's "Zu dir, o Gott, erheben wir", published in 1851.

Orlando Gibbons composed a five-part anthem in English, O Lord, I lift my heart to thee. Heinrich Schütz composed a setting of metred German text, "Nach dir verlangt mich", SWV 122, as part of the Becker Psalter. Johann Sebastian Bach composed an early cantata, which alternates verses from Psalm 25 and poetry by an unknown librettist. Czech composer Antonín Dvořák set verses 16-18 and 20 to music in his Biblical Songs (1894). German composer Lili Wieruszowski (1899-1971) also set Psalm 25 to music.

Bibliography
 Commentaires sur les psaumes, d'Hilaire de Poitiers
 Commentaries on the Psalms, John Chrysostom
 Discourse in the Psalms, Saint Augustine
 Commentaries for the Psalms, Thomas Aquinas 1273
 Commentaries on the Psalms John Calvin 1557
 A Godly and Fruitful Exposition on the Twenty-fifth Psalme, the second of the Penitentials; (in "A Sacred Septenarie.") By ARCHIBALD SYMSON. 1638. p74.
 The Preacher's Tripartie, in Three Books. The First, to raise Devotion in Divine Meditations upon Psalm XXV. By R. MOSSOM, Preacher of God's Word, late at St. Peter's, Paul's Wharf, London, 1657. Folio.
 Six Sermons in "Expository Discourses" by the late Rev. WILLIAM RICHARDSON, Subchanter of York Cathedral. 1825.

References

External links 

 
 
  Mechon-mamre
 Text of Psalm 25 according to the 1928 Psalter
 Of David. To you, O LORD, I lift up my soul text and footnotes, usccb.org United States Conference of Catholic Bishops
 Psalm 25:1 introduction and text, biblestudytools.com
 Psalm 25 – A Plea for Help from the Humble and Reverent enduringword.com
 Psalm 25 / Refrain: Remember, Lord, your compassion and love. Church of England
 Psalm 25 at biblegateway.com
 Hymns for Psalm 25 hymnary.org

025
Works attributed to David